Far Away Trains Passing By is the debut studio album by German electronic musician Ulrich Schnauss, released on 14 November 2001 by City Centre Offices.

Domino Recording Company reissued Far Away Trains Passing By with a second disc of six bonus tracks on 1 November 2005. On 13 October 2008, Independiente issued a remastered edition of the album with an extra disc containing the same bonus tracks, along with the track "A Million Miles Away". Far Away Trains Passing By was remastered again in 2019 for a new reissue, which was released on 3 April 2020 by Scripted Realities; this reissue features the aforementioned seven bonus tracks, along with the tracks "Brooks Was Here" and "A Lie for Breakfast".

Track listing

Personnel
Credits are adapted from the album's liner notes.

 Ulrich Schnauss – production
 Artificial Duck Flavour – cover design
 Markus Knothe – photography
 Loop-O – mastering

References

External links
 

2001 debut albums
Domino Recording Company albums
Ulrich Schnauss albums